= Shattered Dreams of Revolution =

2014 book by Bedross Der Matossian

Shattered Dreams of Revolution: From Liberty to Violence in the Late Ottoman Empire
- First edition
- Author: Bedross Der Matossian
- Language: English
- Subject: Young Turk Revolution
- Genre: Non-fiction
- Publisher: Stanford University Press
- Publication date: 2014
- Publication place: United States

Shattered Dreams of Revolution: From Liberty to Violence in the Late Ottoman Empire is a 2014 book by Bedross Der Matossian, published by Stanford University Press. It discusses the Young Turk Revolution of 1908 and related aspects and contains six chapters.
